The 2008 BigPond 400 was the fourth round of the 2008 V8 Supercar season. It was held on the weekend of 9 to 11 May at Barbagallo Raceway in Wanneroo, north of Perth, Western Australia.

Qualifying
Qualifying was held on Saturday 10 May. Mark Winterbottom snatched pole position away from Mark Skaife in the final seconds of qualifying, which had to that point looked like an all-Holden Racing Team front row with Garth Tander just behind his teammate. Craig Lowndes qualified fourth for Team Vodafone. James Courtney debuted a new Stone Brothers Racing Falcon in fifth place. Todd Kelly likewise made a stellar debut with a new car, qualifying eighth. Jamie Whincup racing the repaired Craig Lowndes car from the Clipsal 500 was a disappointing 22nd, starting alongside fellow points front runner Lee Holdsworth.

Race 1
Race 1 was held on Saturday 10 May. Mark Winterbottom took his second race victory of the year, a surprisingly comfortable win ahead of the HRT pair of Mark Skaife and Garth Tander. Tander was pushed hard by Steven Richards and Craig Lowndes. A collision at race start saw Jason Bright touch Greg Murphy who in turn made contact with Michael Caruso, sending Bright and Caruso out of control towards turn 7, where crossing the track Caruso struck Shane van Gisbergen. The incident triggered a safety car. Jamie Whincup and Will Davison charged through to seventh and eight positions from poor qualifying places. James Courtney was fighting amongst that group but fading rear tyres led Courtney to attempt defensive moves that raised the ire of race control, leading to first the bad sportsmanship flag, then a black flag drive through penalty which dropped him down field.

Race 2
Race 2 was held on Sunday 11 May. Winterbottom backed it up with a second race victory, pushed all the way by Garth Tander. Jason Richards missed the start with engine problems. A slow start from Mark Skaife off the front row saw a collision with Steven Richards at turn 3 of the first lap. Skaife broadsided the wall but Richards attempted to continue with a punctured left rear tyre, limping back to the pits. Russell Ingall result was caused by a drive-through penalty for pit-lane speeding. Lee Holdsworth was pinged for a drive-through for an unsafe pitstop release, emerging onto the track as rain began to fall and made contact with Paul Dumbrell.  Cameron McConville slithered into the stopped cars. Ingall, likewise put down-field by his penalty stop damaged his steering in a clash with race leader Jamie Whincup as Ingall was being lapped. Ingall later picked up a $5,000 fine for careless driving. Whincup stayed out during the brief rain squall, and took advantage of being able to pitstop at a better time, jumping back into the field in third place, right in front of teammate Craig Lowndes, the Team Vodafone pair race to the finish together. James Courtney recovered from race 1 dramas to finish seventh while Steven Richards recovered to ninth position falling just short of overtaking Todd Kelly. Shane van Gisbergen's repaired Falcon just made the top ten.

Race 3
Race 3 was held on Sunday 11 May. An early race clash between Russell Ingall and Jason Richards, saw Richards into the pits with a front left puncture and a flapping door for Ingall. Ingall then subsequently picked up his second pit lane speeding infringement of the weekend.

Results
Results as follows:

Qualifying

Race 1 results

Race 2 results

Race 3 results

Standings
After round 4 of 14

Support categories
The 2008 BigPond 400 had four support categories.

References

External links
Official timing and results

Perth V8 400
Perth V8 400
Sport in Perth, Western Australia
Motorsport in Western Australia